The Council of Heraldry and Vexillology (French: Conseil d’héraldique et de vexillologie) is the Heraldic authority for the French-speaking Community of Belgium. It is the institution that advises the Government of the French-speaking Community on all matters concerning civic, personal, and familial arms and flags. Grants of arms from the Council are published in the Belgian official journal.

Purpose 
This institution was created in 1985 through a decree by the French Community of Belgium. Its first purpose was to give the French Community its arms, to recognise the arms, seals and flags of cities and municipalities (communes) issued from fusions and to publish from its work, an armorial of the French Community of Belgium.

After this armorial was published in 2002, the council was charged in 2010 to give to the government opinions and advice regarding anything concerning arms of physical persons, families and family associations and their registry. This mission was previously the role of the Royal Belgian Genealogical and Heraldic Office.

Other Heraldic authorities in Belgium 
The Flemish Heraldic Council has a similar purpose in the Flemish Community and the Council of Nobility (est. 1844) grants arms to the nobility in all of Belgium.

Publications

Personal armorials 

 Armoiries de personnes physiques et d’association familiale en Communauté française. 2012-2013, Jean-Paul Springael, 2014, 221 pages.

Municipal armorials 

 Armoiries communales en Belgique. Communes wallonnes, bruxelloises et germanophones, Philippe de Bounam de Ryckholt, Christophe de Fossa, Albert Derbaix, Jean-Marie Duvosquel, Roger Harmignies, Christiane Pantens, Pierre Philippart de Foy, and Andrée Scufflaire; illustrations by Luc Onclin et Rudy Demotte. - Brussels : Dexia Banque, 2002. - 2 volumes. -

Composition of the Council

See also 

Belgian heraldry
Royal Belgian Genealogical and Heraldic Office
Burgher arms

Other heraldic authorities

Belgium 
Council of Nobility
Flemish Heraldic Council

Rest of the world 
College of Arms (England, Wales, Norther Ireland, New Zealand)
Lord Lyon (Scotland)
Chief Herald of Ireland
Canadian Heraldic Authority 
Bureau of Heraldry (South Africa)

References

External links 

 Council of Heraldry and Vexillology of the French Community of Belgium
 Royal Association Genealogical and Heraldic Office of Belgium

Heraldic authorities